Lettuce is a leafy vegetable. The name is also applied to other related and unrelated plants. Including the leafy vegetable these are
the cultivated lettuce, Lactuca sativa
other species of the genus Lactuca
wall lettuce, Mycelis muralis or Lactuca muralis
miner's lettuce, Claytonia perfoliata
lamb's lettuce, Valerianella locusta
chalk lettuce, Dudleya pulverulenta

Lettuce may also refer to:

Lettuce (band), American funk band
Fresh Lettuce (band), American rap band
Lettuce sandwich
Hedda Lettuce, American drag performer
Lettuce Lake, a body of water in Lettuce Lake Park
Lettuce as a slang for "hair" in bro culture
Liz Truss lettuce, sometimes referred to as "the lettuce"

See also
The lettuce (disambiguation)
Lettuce Entertain You Enterprises, a restaurant consortium
Lettice (disambiguation)